United Nations Security Council resolution 621, adopted unanimously on 20 September 1988, after hearing a joint report by the Secretary-General and Organisation of African Unity (OAU), the Council noted an agreement between Morocco and the Frente Polisario on 30 August 1988 to the joint proposals by the Secretary-General and OAU.

The Council noted its anxiety to those efforts to support a referendum for self-determination of the people of Western Sahara, organised and supervised by the United Nations in conjunction with the OAU. In this vein, the resolution decided to appoint a Special Representative for Western Sahara, requesting the Secretary-General to transmit a report on the holding of a referendum in Western Sahara and ways to ensure the organisation of such a referendum by the UN and OAU.

See also
 History of Western Sahara
 List of United Nations Security Council Resolutions 601 to 700 (1987–1991)
 Polisario Front
 Sahrawi Arab Democratic Republic
 United Nations Mission for the Referendum in Western Sahara

References
Text of the Resolution at undocs.org

External links
 

 0621
 0621
September 1988 events
1980s in Western Sahara